The Forestry Research Institute of Sweden, or Skogforsk, is a research institute headquartered in Uppsala, jointly financed by the members of the Swedish forestry industry and the Government. The institute aims to provide the industry with knowledge, products, and services, for more cost-effective and sustainable forestry, leading to increased competitiveness and realization of societal goals. The demand-driven applied research includes a wide variety of fields, such as forest technology, raw-material utilization, environmental impact and conservation, forest tree breeding, logistics, forest bioenergy and silviculture. The institute has budget of approximately SEK 150 M, with a staff of 120 people, of which about 80 are researchers.

References

External links
https://www.skogforsk.se/english/
Skogforsk knowledge base (Swedish)
ETT vehicle on YouTube

Sweden
Research institutes in Sweden
Forestry in Sweden